Kansas v. Crane, 534 U.S. 407 (2002), is a United States Supreme Court case in which the Court upheld the Kansas Sexually Violent Predator Act (SVPA) as consistent with substantive due process. The Court clarified that its earlier holding in Kansas v. Hendricks (1997) did not set forth a requirement of total or complete lack of control, but noted that the Constitution does not permit commitment of a sex offender without some lack-of-control determination.

Circumstances
Michael Crane pleaded guilty to aggravated sexual battery for two incidents on the same day in 1993. In the first, Crane exposed himself to a tanning salon attendant. One half hour later, Crane exposed himself to the clerk in a video store and demanded she perform oral sex on him, threatening to rape her before leaving. After Crane's guilty plea, the State petitioned to have Crane evaluated and adjudicated a sexual predator under Kansas' SVPA which permits the civil detention of a person convicted of any of several listed sexual offenses, if it can be proven beyond a reasonable doubt that he suffers from a "mental abnormality"—a disorder affecting his "emotional or volitional capacity which predisposes the person to commit sexually violent offenses"—or a "personality disorder," either of "which makes the person likely to engage in repeat acts of sexual violence." Kan. Stat. Ann. §§59-29a02(a), (b) (2000 Cum. Supp.).

Several psychologists examined Crane and diagnosed him with exhibitionism and antisocial personality disorder. One psychologist concluded that the two diagnoses in combination placed Crane within the listed sexual disorders covered by the SVPA, "cit[ing] the increasing frequency of incidents involving [respondent], increasing intensity of the incidents, [respondent's] increasing disregard for the rights of others, and his increasing daring and aggressiveness." Another psychologist testified that Crane's behavior was marked by "impulsivity or failure to plan ahead," indicating his unlawfulness "was a combination of willful and uncontrollable behavior," id., at 584-585, 7 P. 3d, at 290. The State's experts agreed, however, that "[r]espondent's mental disorder does not impair his volitional control to the degree he cannot control his dangerous behavior." Id., at 581, 7 P. 3d, at 288.

Crane moved for a summary judgment which was denied by the trial court and gave jury instructions to the terms of the statute. Id., at 581, 7 P. 3d, at 287-288. The jury found that Crane was a sexual predator as defined by the SVPA. The Kansas Supreme Court reversed, holding the SVPA unconstitutional as Crane had only a personality disorder rather than a volitional impairment. For such a person, it held, the State must show not merely a likelihood that the defendant would engage in repeat acts of sexual violence, but also an inability to control violent behavior, based on Kansas v. Hendricks (1997).

Decision
The court decided, in a split 7–2 opinion  that the Constitution does not permit commitment of the type of dangerous sexual offender considered in Hendricks without any lack-of-control evaluation. They concluded that the Kansas Supreme Court interpreted Kansas v. Hendricks too restrictively when they ruled that a sexual offender who has only an emotional or personality disorder, not a volitional impairment, must be found not to have the ability to control dangerous behavior.

The required standard of proof had to be sufficient to make the distinction between a dangerous sexual offender whose serious mental illness or abnormality, made him eligible for civil commitment from the "dangerous but typical recidivist" offender convicted in an ordinary criminal case. However, the Court concluded that an absolute finding of lack of control was not necessary, since otherwise there would be a risk of barring the civil commitment of some highly dangerous persons suffering severe mental abnormalities.

Significance
This ruling made it substantially more difficult for States to place sex offenders in civil confinement after they've served their sentence.

See also
United States v. Comstock (2010)
List of United States Supreme Court cases, volume 534
List of United States Supreme Court cases

Footnotes

External links
 

United States Supreme Court cases
United States Supreme Court cases of the Rehnquist Court
United States substantive due process case law
2002 in United States case law